The Tuichi River (in Spanish Río Tuichi) is a river in the Madidi National Park in the north of Bolivia. The Tuichi River flows through the rainforest and joins the Beni River south of Rurrenabaque.

See also 
 Madidi River

References

Rivers of La Paz Department (Bolivia)